Kyriakos Rokos is a Greek sculptor.

A number of his sculptures are displayed in the Republic of Cyprus and he was commissioned with several other sculptors to create public artwork for the Cypriot community, most notably in Limassol. 
In October 2009, he had an exposition of sculptures and drawings in the multicultural center Apollo-Prefecture of Piraeus ("Nomarhia Peiraia").

External links
Works at Euran.com
Image of Kyriakos Rokos

(http://www.naturpark-sure.lu/cms/pages/files/00084.pdf)

Greek sculptors
Living people
Year of birth missing (living people)